Environmental Foundation Limited (EFL) is a public interest litigation and environmental conservation organisation in Sri Lanka. Established in 1981, EFL seeks to protect and conserve the natural environment through litigation, advocacy, awareness and youth-engagement.

Cases

Galle Face Green case 
In 2005, the foundation won a case filed in the public interest to maintain the Galle Face Green Beach as a public utility.

Amarawewa Forest clearing for biofuel 
The foundnation,  together with Wildlife and Nature Protection Society and others, won a fundamental rights application filed in the Supreme Court against the planting of Gliricidia trees for biofuel production and illegal clearing of land to create roads in Amarawewa, near Yala National Park.

Air pollution cases 
Environmental Foundation Limited instituted a case against the high levels of air pollution in the Colombo Metropolitan area in 2014. As a result, vehicle emission testing was initiated by Department of Motor Traffic and Central Environmental Authority.

A Fundamental Rights Application filed by the foundation to object to the use of coal to generate power resulted in the cancellation of a proposed coal power plant.

Projects

Advocacy and Awareness 
The foundation advocates for policies to ban single-use plastic items, carries out a project to restore the water quality in Kelani River, campaigns to prevent degazetting of protected areas for development projects, litigates against illegal tourism in ecologically sensitive areas, advocates against the downgrading of 'other state forests, litigates to stop deforestation in Wilpattu National Park, develops sustainable frameworks for PET recycling, advocates against illegal mining, promotes sustainable energy and publishes conservation research.

It hosts monthly panel discussions on different environmental issues such as deforestation, climate change and conducts awareness sessions and workshops for school children, university students and the public.

See also 

 Wildlife and Nature Protection Society

References 

Environmental organisations based in Sri Lanka
Advocacy groups
Conservation and environmental foundations
Environmental law
Nature conservation in Sri Lanka
Non-profit organisations based in Sri Lanka